Kudzu powder, called géfěn in Chinese, kuzuko in Japanese, chik-garu or galbun in Korean, and bột sắn dây in Vietnamese is a starch powder made from the root of the kudzu plant. It is used in traditional East Asian cuisine mainly for thickening sauces and making various types of desserts.

Examples of dishes that use kuzuko:
 ankake (liquid stock thickened with kuzuko)
 goma-dofu (kuzuko pudding with sesame paste)

Examples of wagashi (Japanese desserts) with kuzuko:
 kuzukiri (clear cake of boiled kuzuko cut into noodle-like strips and eaten with kuromitsu)
 kuzuzakura (a.k.a. kuzu-dama, a cake of bean paste covered with kuzuko)
 Mizu manjū (red bean paste is coated with translucent kuzuko paste that is then allowed to set into a jelly-like consistency)

Examples of Tong sui (Chinese desserts usually in soup form)
 Got Fan soup

References

Chinese cuisine
Japanese cuisine
Korean cuisine